John Gordon Haynes (June 22, 1918 – December 24, 2004) was a Canadian curler. He played on the 1957 and 1958 Brier-winning Team Albertas, skipped by Matt Baldwin. He was from Edmonton and worked for Canadian Pacific Express. He began curling in Sedgwick, Alberta. Haynes died in December 2004 at the age of 86.

References

1918 births
2004 deaths
Brier champions
Canadian male curlers
Curlers from Edmonton